Paulino Martínez may refer to:

 Paulino Martínez (cyclist) (born 1952), Spanish cyclist
 Paulino Martínez (footballer) (born 1973), Spanish footballer